Kershaw is a town in Lancaster County, South Carolina, United States. It was incorporated in 1888. As of the 2010 census, the population was 1,803, and as of 2019 the estimated population was 2,321.

History
The Dr. William Columbus Cauthen House, Clinton AME Zion Church, East Richland Street-East Church Street Historic District, Kershaw Depot, Matson Street Historic District, and Unity Baptist Church are listed on the National Register of Historic Places.

Geography and climate
Kershaw is located in southern Lancaster County at  (34.547245, -80.582843). U.S. Routes 521 and 601 pass through the town. Together the two highways lead south  to Camden.

The town drains west to Lick Creek and east to the Little Lynches River, all part of the Lynches River watershed flowing southeast to the Great Pee Dee River.

Demographics

2020 census

As of the 2020 United States census, there were 1,693 people, 736 households, and 480 families residing in the town.

2000 census
At the 2000 census there were 1,645 people, and 465 families in the town. The population density was 888.5 people per square mile (343.3/km). There were 771 housing units at an average density of 416.4 per square mile (160.9/km).  The racial makeup of the town was 75.68% White, 22.80% African American, 0.36% Native American, 0.12% Asian, 0.24% from other races, and 0.79% from two or more races. Hispanic or Latino of any race were 0.73%.

Of the 690 households 26.8% had children under the age of 18 living with them, 50.7% were married couples living together, 13.0% had a female householder with no husband present, and 32.6% were non-families. 30.1% of households were one person and 16.8% were one person aged 65 or older. The average household size was 2.38 and the average family size was 2.95.

The age distribution was 22.5% under the age of 18, 8.6% from 18 to 24, 24.5% from 25 to 44, 23.0% from 45 to 64, and 21.3% 65 or older. The median age was 42 years. For every 100 females, there were 86.7 males. For every 100 females age 18 and over, there were 82.1 males.

The median household income was $36,065 and the median family income  was $41,204. Males had a median income of $30,987 versus $21,827 for females. The per capita income for the town was $16,370. About 9.5% of families and 14.4% of the population were below the poverty line, including 19.6% of those under age 18 and 11.4% of those age 65 or over.

Education
Kershaw has a public library, a branch of the Lancaster County Library.

References

External links
 

Towns in Lancaster County, South Carolina
Towns in South Carolina
1888 establishments in South Carolina